Button Township is one of twelve townships in Ford County, Illinois, USA.  As of the 2010 census, its population was 281 and it contained 116 housing units.  The township was formed from a portion of Patton Township in December 1864.

History
Button Township was named for James Porter Button, who served as township supervisor, justice of the peace, and county treasurer.

Geography

Unincorporated towns
 Clarence

Cemeteries
The township contains these three cemeteries: Mount Olivet, Pleasant Grove and Trickle Grove.

Major highways
  Illinois Route 9

Demographics

School districts
 Hoopeston Area Community Unit School District 11
 Paxton-Buckley-Loda Community Unit School District 10

Political districts
 Illinois' 15th congressional district
 State House District 106
 State Senate District 53

References
 
 United States Census Bureau 2007 TIGER/Line Shapefiles
 United States National Atlas

External links
 City-Data.com
 Illinois State Archives

Townships in Ford County, Illinois
Townships in Illinois